Dioryctria pineae is a species of snout moth in the genus Dioryctria. It was described by Otto Staudinger in 1859 and is known from the Iberian Peninsula, France, Italy, Croatia and Greece.

The wingspan is 36–37 mm.

References

Moths described in 1859
pineae
Moths of Europe